Benjamin Mako Hill is a free software activist, hacker, author, and professor. He is a contributor and free software developer as part of the Debian and Ubuntu projects as well as the co-author of three technical manuals on the subject, Debian GNU/Linux 3.1 Bible, The Official Ubuntu Server Book, and The Official Ubuntu Book.

Hill is an assistant professor in Communication at the University of Washington.

Biography
Hill has an undergraduate degree in Literature & Technology from Hampshire College, a master's degree from the MIT Media Lab, and a PhD in an interdepartmental program involving the MIT Sloan School of Management and the MIT Media Lab. As of fall 2013, he is an assistant professor in the Department of Communication at the University of Washington. He is also a Fellow at the MIT Center for Civic Media where he coordinates the development of software for civic organizing. He has worked as an advisor and contractor for the One Laptop per Child project. He is a speaker for the GNU Project, and serves on the board of Software Freedom International (the organization that organizes Software Freedom Day). In 2006, he married Mika Matsuzaki and used mathematically constrained wedding vows at the marriage ceremony.

Debian 
Since 1999, Hill has been an active member of Debian. He has served as a delegate of the Debian Project Leader, and is a founder and coordinator of Debian Non-Profit, a Debian custom distribution designed to fill the needs of small non-profit organizations. In addition he served on the board of Software in the Public Interest from March 2003 until July 2006, serving as the organisation's vice-president from August 2004.

Ubuntu 

Hill is also a core developer and founding member of Ubuntu, and continues to be an active contributor to the project. In addition to technical responsibilities, he coordinated the construction of a community around the Ubuntu Project as project "community manager" (later ceding the role to Jono Bacon) during Ubuntu's first year and a half. During this period, he worked full-time for Canonical Ltd. Within the Project, he served on the "Community Council" governance board that oversees all non-technical aspects of the project, until October 2011. His work included contributing to a code of conduct and diversity statement for the project.

Other work 
In addition to software development, Hill writes extensively. He has been published in academic books and magazines, newsletters, and online journals, and Slate Magazine republished one of his blog posts. He is the author of the Free Software Project Management HOWTO, the canonical document on managing Free and open-source software (FOSS) projects, and has published academic work on FOSS from anthropological, sociological, management and software engineering perspectives and has written and spoken about intellectual property, copyright, and collaboration more generally. He has also studied the sociology of community involvement in web communities, and been widely published and cited about projects like Scratch and Wikipedia. He has talked about these topics publicly, as well as giving a keynote address at 2008 OSCON.

Hill has worked for several years as a consultant for FOSS projects specializing in coordinating releases of software as free or open software and structuring development efforts to encourage community involvement. He spends a significant amount of his time traveling and giving talks on FOSS and intellectual property primarily in Europe and North America.

Previous to his current positions, Hill pursued research full-time as a graduate researcher at the MIT Media Laboratory. At the lab, he has worked in both the Electronic Publishing and Computing Culture groups on collaborative writing and decision-making software. One project, Selectricity is a voting tool which received prizes and grants from MTV and Cisco. He was a fellow at the Harvard Berkman Center for Internet & Society and the MIT Center for Civic Media.

He served on the advisory board of the Wikimedia Foundation, the advisory council of the Open Knowledge Foundation and the board of the Free Software Foundation. He was a founding member of the Ubuntu Community Council in 2009.

Awards
2018-2019 Fellow at the Center for Advanced Study in the Social and Behavioral Sciences

2019 Research Symbiont Award—General Symbiont

Bibliography
 Debian GNU/Linux 3.1 Bible 
 The Official Ubuntu Server Book 
 The Official Ubuntu Book

References

External links 

 
 Copyrighteous — personal weblog
 Biography from the University of Washington
 revealingerrors.com
 MIT LabCAST: Selectricity
 Laboratories of Oligarchy, video recording of a presentation at the Berkman Center for Internet and Society.

1980 births
Open source people
Living people
Copyright activists
Debian people
Free software programmers
GNU people
Hampshire College alumni
MIT Sloan School of Management alumni
Members of the Free Software Foundation board of directors
MIT Sloan School of Management faculty
Ubuntu (operating system) people
Wikimedia Foundation Advisory Board members
University of Washington faculty